Tinkering toward Utopia: A Century of Public School Reform is a history of American public school reform written by David Tyack and Larry Cuban. It was published by Harvard University Press in 1995.

Further reading

External links 

 

1995 non-fiction books
English-language books
History books about education
Harvard University Press books
American history books